Verax may refer to:

People
 Verax, self-assigned code name of Edward Snowden (born 1983)
 Verax, pseudonym of Henry Dunckley (1823–1896)
 Theodorus Verax, pseudonym of Clement Walker (died 1651)

Science
 Bucculatrix Verax, a leaf miner
 Marasmarcha verax, a moth

Other
 , an Italian cargo ship in service 1951–60
 "Rector Potens, Verax Deus", a hymn
 Verax (film), a 2013 short film about Edward Snowden